Samsari Range is a volcanic range in southern Georgia,  to the southwest of Tbilisi. It is a part of the Highland of Southern Georgia and rises above the Javakheti and Tsalka Plateaus. There is archaeological evidence of ancient forts on some of the peaks.

Mountains
Other notable peaks include: 

 Godorebi 
 Karakuzei 
 Shavnabada 
 Samsari 
 Mt. Tavkvetili 
 Western Shaori 

Mount Samsari has a fairly large caldera, the floor of which is covered by the rocks from the mountain's last eruption.

Vegetation
The slopes of the Abul-Samsari Range are mainly covered with alpine meadows and grasslands.

There are numerous small and medium-sized lakes in and around the Abul-Samsari Range.

See also
 Mount Didi Abuli
 Javakheti Range
 Javakheti Plateau
 Lesser Caucasus

References

External links

Mountain ranges of the Caucasus
Mountain ranges of Georgia (country)